Raquel del Rosario Macías  (born 3 November 1982) is a Spanish singer. She was the lead vocalist of the band  (Morpheus' Dream).

Biography
Raquel is the second of six children. At the age of 14, she started writing the first of many songs. Raquel, a self-taught musician, was 17 when she met David Feito from Asturias, who headed a Celtic-based music group.

In 2000, Raquel left her native Gran Canaria for Asturias with David and joined his group, Xemà, finally to see their first album released. Soon after Raquel and David met Juan Luis Suárez, and the three created El Sueño de Morfeo. Raquel del Rosario is the vocalist of this Spanish band, and she has written and composed most of their songs with the help of David and Juan.

In 2011, she competed together with Luca Barbarossa in the 2011 Sanremo Music Festival, where they finished in 8th place with the song "Fino in fondo". Then she took part in the Eurovision Song Contest 2013 in Malmö, Sweden, with her band El Sueño De Morfeo and the song "Contigo hasta el final" (With You Until The End), representing Spain. They finished in 25th place in the final, second-to-last.

Personal life

In 2006, she married Formula One racing driver Fernando Alonso. They lived in Oxford, England until they moved to Mont-sur-Rolle, near Lake Geneva, Switzerland in 2006. In February 2010 they moved to Lugano, Switzerland in order to be closer to his new Formula One employer Ferrari. On 20 December 2011 the couple announced their divorce to the press. In 2013, Raquel married Pedro Castro, a Galician photographer and film maker. He first met her while directing the video for her band's song "Si no estás". In 2014, she gave birth to their first child, Leo. In 2016, she gave birth to her second son, Mael.

References

External links
 "El Sueño de Morfeo" Group Official Web Page
 

1982 births
Living people
Singers from the Canary Islands
People from Gran Canaria
Spanish women singers
El Sueño de Morfeo
Racing drivers' wives and girlfriends

de:Raquel del Rosario